Museo Civico Federico Eusebio (Italian for Federico Eusebio Civic Museum)  is an archeology and Natural history museum in Alba, province of Cuneo, Piedmont, Italy.

History
The museum was founded in 1897 as a historic and archeologic collection under the guidance of Federico Eusebio. In 1976, the museum moved to the actual site and added the natural history collections of the town.

Collection
Gallery Slideshow

Among the items on display is the finely carved marble funereal monument (1st century AD) for Caius Cornelius Germanus.

References

Notes

 

Alba, Piedmont
Museums in Piedmont
Archaeological museums in Italy
Natural history museums in Italy